Santiago Apostol Church, also known as Plaridel Church or Quingua Church, is a 15th-century Roman Catholic Church under the patronage of Saint James the Apostle and is located along Gov. Padilla street, Brgy. Poblacion, in Plaridel, Bulacan, Philippines. In 1961, a historical marker was installed on the church by the National Historical Committee (precursor of the National Historical Commission of the Philippines).

History

The church of Plaridel, or Quingua was first established as one of the visitas of Malolos in 1581 and Fray Mateo Mendoza OSA who administered the Malolos Convent began the Christianization of Encomienda Binto y Quingua. It was located in a barrio now called "Lumangbayan" the mission chapel was soon transferred to its present location across the river Quingua (now known as Angat River) because of frequent flooding. Due to long distance of Malolos Convent to the Visita of Binto making the friars to be physically exhausted, the Augustinian prior of Malolos Fray Roque de Barrionuevo made the elevation of Visita of Binto into a Quasi-Parish on September 27, 1602. On April 30, 1605, Quingua was officially established as a full pledge Parish with Fray. Diego Pardo OSA as its first parish priest under the advocacy of Santiago de Matamoro. A Church was built on the new location starting 1602 and took 15 years to complete. The adobe stones used in the church were from the town of Meycauayan while the bricks used were made at Sitio Nabugtos at Brgy. Sta. Ines. In the year 1612, Quingua already had its own convent and 1,800 parishioners. It is said that the parish was not as wealthy as other convents in the Provincia de Bulacan during that time and that it was exempted from its fees to the Augustinian Province in the Philippines located at the San Agustin Church, Intramuros, from 1640 to 1704. The 1605 church was razed by fire after being hit by lightning. As a result, in 1722 a new church was built by Fr. Tomas Quijano on the same site. In 1772, the church was razed by fire once more but was quickly rebuilt. During the British Invasion in the 18th century, some of the treasures and documents owned by the San Agustin Monastery in Intramuros were transferred to the convent of Quingua. The church suffered immensely from an earthquake in 1863 but was repaired the same year. According to the historical marker installed by the National Historical Committee, the church also served as a military hospital and cuartel by the Americans in 1899.

Long time administered by the Archdiocese of Manila, on March 11, 1962 with the establishment of the Roman Catholic Diocese of Malolos, the Quingua Church and Convent administration and ownership was transferred to the Diocese of Malolos, making Quingua Church the center of one of the original nine vicarias of Malolos, the Vicariate of Plaridel or the Vicariate of Santiago Apostol comprising the parishes in the municipalities of Calumpit, Balagtas (Bigaa), Guiguinto, Baliwag, Pulilan and Plaridel (Quingua).

Architecture
The present stone and brick church is barn-style Baroque mixed with Moorish ornamentation. The first level of the façade consists of a main trefoil arch doorway flanked by two niches of saints. The second level, with its three windows, is plainly adorned by four pairs of pillars. The pointed arch shaped pediment (resembling a minaret), on the other hand, is richly ornamented with carvings of cherubs, saints and other embellishments surrounding the oculus or rose window. At the peak of the pediment is a carving of the pierced heart of Jesus. Attached to left of the façade is the five-storey bell tower with a quadrilateral base and octagonal upper levels and topped by a cone-shaped dome. There are five bells in the belfry, the biggest of which is dedicated to Nuestra Senora de la Consolación.

Simborio Chapel
Near the church is an octagonal chapel locally known as the Simborio Chapel. Believed to have been built in the 1800s, the chapel may have functioned as a mortuary chapel although its current location in a residential area is a few meters away from the Catholic cemetery. The chapel features pointed arch windows and semicircular niches on its base.

Daughter Parishes

Chapels subdued

Mandated Organizations
 Commission on Liturgy
 Lay Eucharistic Ministers
 Parish Music Ministry
 Apostolado ng Panalangin
 Lector/ Commentator
 Legion of Mary
 Ostiarates (Mass Collectors/Usherettes)
 Mother Butler Mission Guild
 Cofradia delos Camareros de Quingua
 Cofradia dela Virgen Consolacion Y Correa (The oldest Organization in the Parish)
 Confraternity of Saint James the Great - Quingua
 Commission on Family and Life
 Marriage Encounter Community
 Tipanan Community
 Commission on Social Action:
 Knights of Columbus 6613
 Catholic Women's' League
 Commission on Formation:
 El Shaddai Prayer Community
 Soldiers of Christ
 Holy Family Family Prayer Community
 Bible Apostolate
 PAndiyosesis na Sentro ng Katekista (PASKA)
 Basic Ecclesial Communities (Currently: 70 plus buklod)
 Commission on Youth
 Commission on Social Communication
 Commission on Temporal Goods

Parish Priest (Order of Saint Augustine)
 Rdo. P. Diego Vasquez
 Rdo. P. Diego Pardo
 Rdo. P. Luiz Gutierrez
 Rdo. P. Luiz Ruiz Brito
 Rdo. P. Geronimo Medrano
 Rdo. P. Luiz Gutierrez
 Rdo. P. Bartolome Alcantara
 Rdo. P. Bernabe de Leon
 Rdo. P. Antonio Mojica
 Rdo. P. Bernabe de Leon
 Rdo. P. Alonso Sandoval
 Rdo. P. Baltazar Herrera
 Rdo. P. Antonio Mojica
 Rdo. P. Tomas Velasco
 Rdo. P. Antonio Mojica
 Rdo. P. Baltazar Herrera
 Rdo. P. Alonso Coronel
 Rdo. P. Francisco Castillo
 Rdo. P. Antonio Carrion
 Rdo. P. Gaspar Serrano Padilla
 Rdo. P. Luis Herrera
 Rdo. P. Diego Gutierrez dela Fuente
 Rdo. P. Cristobal Marroquin
 Rdo. P. Pedro Cañales
 Rdo. P. Carlos Bautista
 Rdo. P. Ildefonso de Escos
 Rdo. P. Felipe Jaurigue
 Rdo. P. Juan de Peralta
 Rdo. P. Jose de Medina
 Rdo. P. Felix Bejar
 Rdo. P. Jose Zalduendo
 Rdo. P. Carlos Elloriaga
 Rdo. P. Jose Serrano
 Rdo. P. Carlos Elloriaga
 Rdo. P. Gaspar Garcia Sossa
 Rdo. P. Jose Nebot
 Rdo. P. Francisco Nuñez
 Rdo. P. Bernardo Iglesia
 Rdo. P. Tomas Quijano
 Rdo. P. Bernardo Iglesia
 Rdo. P. Miguel Vivas
 Rdo. P. Fernando Sanchez
 Rdo. P. Francisco Nuñez	
 Rdo. P. Bernardo Sanchez
 Rdo. P. Francisco Bencuchillo
 Rdo. P. Juan Jaurigue
 Rdo. P. Manuel Zamora
 Rdo. P. Manuel Baceta
 Rdo. P. Manuel Cortazar
 Rdo. P. Francisco Cameselle
 Rdo. P. Manuel Baceta
 Rdo. P. Tomas Sanchez Parada
 Rdo. P. Jose de Leon
 Rdo. P. Domingo Beovide
 Rdo. P. Diego Perez
 Rdo. P. Bernardino Notario
 Rdo. P. Manuel Rivera
 Rdo. P. Juan Cuadrado
 Rdo. P. Dionisio de Sta. Maria
 Rdo. P. Santiago Villoria
 Rdo. P. Juan Crespo
 Rdo. P. Fulgencio Sainz
 Rdo. P. Juan Serrano
 Rdo. P. Manuel Cortazar
 Rdo. P. Servando De Bergantin
 Rdo. P. S.V. Utor
 Rdo. P. Florentino Monasterio
 Rdo. P. Angel Vesa
 Rdo. P. Pedro Ruiz
 Rdo. P. Emilio Mercado
 Rdo. P. Pedro Quiroz

Parish Priest (Filipino Priest)
 Rdo. P. Victorino Lopez
 Rdo. P. Gabino Baluyot
 Rdo. P. Marcelino Fajardo
 Rdo. Mons. Honorio Resurreccion
 Rdo. P. Gonzalo Sarreal
 Rdo. P. Hermogenez Ersando
 Rdo. Mons. Serafin Riego de Dios
 Rdo. Mons. Roman O. Nocon
 Rdo. P. Anacleto C. Ignacio
 Rdo. P. Jose Dennis A. Espejo
 Rdo. P. Elmer R. Ignacio
 Rdo. P. Rufino L. Sulit

Parochial Vicar
 Rdo. P. Feliciano Palma
 Rdo. P. Luciano Paguiligan
 Rdo. P. Regalado San Pedro
 Rdo. P. Eliseo Carreon
 Rdo. P. Jose Aguilar, Jr.
 Rdo. P. Rafael Balite Jr.
 Rdo. P. Gabriel Jocson
 Rdo. P. Jose Vengco
 Rdo. P. Eugenio Marcelo
 Rdo. P. Protacio Gunggon (Former Antipolo Bishop)
 Rdo. P.Generoso Santos
 Rdo. P. Bienvenido Lopez
 Rdo. P. Deogracias Iñiguez (Former Kalookan Bishop)
 Rdo. P. Nicomedes Del Rosario
 Rdo. P. Cesar Suarez
 Rdo. P. Romeo Dionisio
 Rdo. P. Javer Joaquin
 Rdo. P. Flormonico Cadiz
 Rdo. P. Nicanor Castro
 Rdo. P. Alejandro Enriquez
 Rdo. P. Reynaldo Rivera
 Rdo. P. Benito Justiniano
 Rdo. P. Joey Buencamino
 Rdo. P. Lamberto Tomas
 Rdo. P. Gregorio Dazo, Jr.
 Rdo P. Jun Espiritu
 Rdo. P. Joselito Rodriguez
 Rdo. P. Francis Cortez III
 Rdo. P. Leopoldo Evangelista
 Rdo. P. Vincent Reyes
 Rdo. P. Ramon Bernardo
 Rdo. P. Alvin Pila
 Rdo. P. Renato Brion, Jr.
 Rdo. P. Daniel Sevilla
 Rdo. P. Edgardo Toribio, Jr.
 Rdo. P. Romeo Sasi
 Rdo. P. Menald Leonardo

St. James' Salubong Festival

A fiesta for horse lovers is the popular two-day celebration called "Pintakasi ng mga Caballero" held before New Year's Eve in Plaridel, Bulacan. Its main attraction, held on December 29, is a colorful parade of cocheros, jockeys and other equine aficionados, followed by a tilbury race (horse-drawn chariots for two), whose participants include movie stars (particularly members of the clan of the late former Bulacan Governor Jose Padilla, I), luminaries of the province and government officials.

This annual celebrations delight to both local and foreign tourists turned 400 years old last December. It is actually the traditional feast of San Tiago Mata Moros in Plaridel town.

Multitudes of devotees, who are joined by tourists, flock to Plaridel every year either to witness or participate in this colorful ritual in honor of San Tiago, or St. James the Apostle, who has been depicted as a horse rider. San Tiago is considered the unofficial patron of cocheros and jockeys.

St. James the Apostle is the cousin of Christ. His image, portrayed riding on a white horse trampling upon pagan figures, is brought in a procession from its "home" in Barangay Sipat and transferred to the Parish Church.

Fiesta organizers dub the ritual preceded by an early morning mass on December 29 at the chapel of Barangay Sipat as, "the traditional salubong." Featured are race studs and the patient horses of caritelas and tilburies with their owners seeking blessing during the translacion or transfer of their patron saint.

The procession is called salubong because San Tiago's image tailed by groups of faithful including elderly women wearing kimona’t saya and buntal hats performing a ritual dance is met by the patron's other devotees halfway from Sipat to Plaridel Parish Church, in the town's poblacion.

Local officials and national figures often join the devotees’ seven-kilometer trek to the parish church. In the past celebration, Tourism Secretary Gemma Cruz Araneta; DOTC Sec. Vicente Rivera Jr., who hails from Plaridel; Former Bulacan Governor Josie Dela Cruz; and former Bulacan Vice Governor Willie Villarama, this town's "adopted son", led the procession.

The image stays inside the parish to give time for the faithful to pay their respects until the following day, December 30, when the image is again carried in a procession around the poblacion. After 14 days, when the fiesta celebration is over, the image, in another simple procession accompanied by fiesta organizers and town officials, will be returned to the Sipat Chapel, popularly known as Hatid.

"Salubong" ritual dates back to the time of Spanish friars who established the town's parish church in 1580, making St. James patron saint of the town. according to a local book of the town's history, the original image of St. James on a white horse brought to Plaridel (then Quingua) by the Spaniards in the 1800s was left in the care of the family of Bernardo Sampana a rebel heathen of Sepoy ancestry who became a Christian convert. The image was housed in their home at Barrio Tabang. Then the Sampanas were ordered by the friars to turn over the said image to the possession of the owners of the Bahay na Bato in Barrio Sipat (which was renamed Santiago), because of the townsfolks' claim that the family was allegedly practicing sorcery.

When the owners of Bahay na Bato died, the image became the possession of Tandang Sitang whose house was eventually turned into a barrio chapel, present home to San Tiago's image in Sipat.

San Tiago, or St. James the Apostle, was a Galilean and brother of St. John the Evangelist. He was ordered killed by Herod Agrippa, King of Judea in 41 A.D. A history book of Philip Van Ness says the tomb of St. James was found in Northern Spain in 718 A.D. Thirty years after that, a war between the Spaniards and the Moors broke out. When the Spaniards were in near defeat, an apparition of St. James, armed with a sword and riding a white horse, appeared "as bright as a star" in the thick of the battle.

The apparition gave life to the demoralized Spanish soldiers and led them to victory over the Moors, who in turn were bedazzled by the blinding image of St. James. This "miracle" probably explains why St. James became patron saint of those who have affinity with horses, like the devotees flocking every year to the colorful Plaridel ritual.

Restoration of ceiling art
Late in November 2013, efforts to restore parts of the Santiago Apostol Church, including its ceiling paintings were completed. The project's proponent was the parish church management under the leadership of Fr. Dennis Espejo in cooperation with the AADG Restoration Group. According to project director Andrew Alto de Guzman, the task was aimed at promoting the appreciation of Quingua's heritage. The project, which took two years to complete involved three stages. The first stage, after extensive research on the structure, was uncovering the church trusses, the tirantes or decorative beams, and the zapata or corbels which supported the original ceiling, all of which were covered in the 1970s when tin sheets and wood were used as the church ceiling. The second stage was remaking the trompe-l'œil paintings in the ceiling based on archival photos. Among the images illustrated were those of Christ, Mary, and the twelve apostles. The artworks were done by local artists Chris Pasco, Mark Villanueva, Roy Gutierrez, Joey de Guzman and assistants. The third phase of the project centered on applying lime plaster to the upper portions of the capitals. The application of palitada was provided by Escuela Taller. The bricked up rose windows on the sides of the church were also exposed.

Colegio de Santiago Apostol
Colegio de Santiago Apostol, Inc. is now on its nine years of existence, but to say existence is an understatement for Colegio has climbed uphill to face the challenges from its humble beginning in 2010. The road rises to meet the struggling but determined steps of CSAI… and there’s no looking back since then. With God’s amazing grace and compassion, and being blessed with dedicated and hardworking administration, faculty and staff, not to mention almost all of them are board passers; and so fortunate indeed to have parents and guardians with unwavering trust and confidence in us, the school, slowly but surely brings to life its avowed mission and vision and reaching its dream for a holistic Catholic education for the youth of Plaridel and nearby towns.
On May 18, 2011, a year after its establishment, our Pre-Elem was granted Government Recognition and five years later, on November 14, 2016, full Government Recognition was granted by the Department of Education to our Elementary Department. It was also during this school year that Colegio de Santiago Apostol has graduated its pioneer batch of Grade 6 Graduates.
In all of its nine years, Colegio has emphasized the school’s identity a top priority. The success of their efforts shown in classrooms designated by their patron saints with each class learning and celebrating the feast of the saint, the daily presence of priests in the school, participating in liturgical and para-liturgical activities of the church and active membership in school and church’s organizations.
The school also boasts of a very low or no faculty and staff turnover each year which enables the school to continue building a safe, nurturing and stable school climate which is truly essential for an effective and efficient learning engagements. Proof of this was the last BULPRISA (Bulacan Private School Association), which our School Rector, Rev. Fr. Elmer R. Ignacio prompted us to join just to expose the children to competitions outside the school to develop their self-confidence. The result was overwhelming for the students brought home the bacon, so to speak, Colegio suddenly ranked amongst the competitive schools, winning in academic and cultural competitions.
Colegio’s population grows in an unprecedented number. Little saints,  old and new, keep marching in..so the need of additional classrooms becomes a big challenge. Fr. Elmer R. Ignacio, SThL., the CSAI indefatigable action superhero, is unstoppable in his construction work since Day 1 when he assumed office in November 2014. Today, the school has a three-storey building with nine air-conditioned classrooms that stands at the heart of Colegio’s grounds, a tangible legacy of Fr. Elmer  to the young pupils entrusted to our care at present and to the next generations to come. Last year, a new computer room, library and another classroom are built for the improvement of school facilities. This year a new three-story building is about to rise which is composed of Science Laboratory, additional classrooms and canteen.
This year, a covered court was added to Colegio's structured, designed for the physical and social activities of the students. Unfortunately due to the pandemic, the students can't use the court yet for their  ball games and Physical Education activities.

References

Spanish Colonial architecture in the Philippines
Roman Catholic churches in Bulacan
Baroque architecture in the Philippines
Churches in the Roman Catholic Diocese of Malolos